Clinostigma exorrhizum is a species of flowering plant in the family Arecaceae. It is found only in Fiji.

References

exorrhizum
Endemic flora of Fiji
Least concern plants
Taxonomy articles created by Polbot